Antal Stašek (born Antonín Zeman) (22 July 1843 – 9 October 1931) was a Czech writer and lawyer.

Life and work
Stašek was born in the village of Stanový (now part of Zlatá Olešnice) in northern Bohemia. From 1877, Stašek was a successful barrister in Semily. His work is mainly set in the area around the Krkonoše mountains that straddle the today's border between the Czech Republic and Poland. Stašek was heavily influenced by socialism and social justice and was perhaps the first Czech writer to work with these themes.

His best known novel is Matusch the Shoemaker and his Friends, published posthumously in 1932. Stašek worked briefly in Mohelnice before moving in 1913 to Prague, where he spent the rest of his life. The writer Ivan Olbracht was his son.

References

1843 births
1931 deaths
People from Jablonec nad Nisou District
People from the Kingdom of Bohemia
Czechoslovak National Democracy politicians
Members of the Revolutionary National Assembly of Czechoslovakia
Czech poets
Czech male poets
Czech translators
19th-century Czech lawyers
20th-century translators
20th-century male writers
20th-century Czech lawyers